Nicholas Wood (1795–1865) was British colliery and locomotive engineer.

Nicholas Wood may also refer to:

Nicholas Wood (merchant) (died 1742), cutler and Member of Parliament for Exeter
Nicholas Wood (MP) (1832–1892), son of the above, Member of Parliament for Houghton-le-Spring
Nick Wood (footballer) (born 1990), English football defender
Nick Wood (rugby union) (born 1983), English rugby union player

See also
Nicholas Woods, known as Nic Woods (born 1995), New Zealand field hockey player